Gareth Richard Vaughan Jones (13 August 1905 – 12 August 1935) was a Welsh journalist who in March 1933 first reported in the Western world, without equivocation and under his own name, the existence of the Soviet famine of 1932–1933, including the Holodomor. 

Jones had reported anonymously in The Times in 1931 on starvation in Soviet Ukraine and Southern Russia, and, after his third visit to the Soviet Union, issued a press release under his own name in Berlin on 29 March 1933 describing the widespread famine in detail. Reports by Malcolm Muggeridge, writing in 1933 as an anonymous correspondent, appeared contemporaneously in the Manchester Guardian; his first anonymous article specifying famine in the Soviet Union was published on 25 March 1933.

After being banned from re-entering the Soviet Union, Jones was kidnapped and murdered in 1935 while investigating in Japanese-occupied Mongolia; his murder was likely committed by the Soviet secret police, the NKVD. Upon his death, former British prime minister David Lloyd George said, "He had a passion for finding out what was happening in foreign lands wherever there was trouble, and in pursuit of his investigations he shrank from no risk. … Nothing escaped his observation, and he allowed no obstacle to turn from his course when he thought that there was some fact, which he could obtain. He had the almost unfailing knack of getting at things that mattered."

Early life and education
Born in Barry, Glamorgan, Jones attended Barry County School, where his father, Major Edgar Jones, was headmaster until around 1933. His mother, Annie Gwen Jones, had worked in Ukraine as a tutor to the children of Arthur Hughes, son of Welsh steel industrialist John Hughes, who founded the town of Hughesovka, modern-day Donetsk, in Ukraine.

Jones graduated from the University College of Wales, Aberystwyth in 1926 with a first-class honours degree in French. He also studied at the University of Strasbourg and at Trinity College, Cambridge, from which he graduated in 1929 with another first in French, German, and Russian. After his death, one of his tutors, Hugh Fraser Stewart, wrote in The Times that Jones had been an "extraordinary linguist". At Cambridge he was active in the Cambridge University League of Nations Union, serving as its assistant secretary.

Career

Teaching; adviser to Lloyd George
After graduating, Jones taught languages briefly at Cambridge, and then in January 1930 was hired as Foreign Affairs Adviser to the British MP and former prime minister David Lloyd George, thanks to an introduction by Thomas Jones. The post involved preparing notes and briefings Lloyd George could use in debates, articles, and speeches, and also included some travel abroad.

Journalism
In 1929, Jones became a professional freelance reporter, and by 1930 was submitting articles to a variety of newspapers and journals.

Germany
In late January and early February 1933, Jones was in Germany covering the accession to power of the Nazi Party, and was in Leipzig on the day Adolf Hitler was appointed Chancellor. He wrote in the Welsh Western Mail that if the  had crashed the history of Europe would have changed.

Soviet Union

By 1932, Jones had been to the Soviet Union twice, for three weeks in the summer of 1930 and for a month in the summer of 1931. He had reported the findings of each trip in his published journalism, including three articles titled "The Two Russias" he published anonymously in The Times in 1930, and three increasingly explicit articles, also anonymous, titled "The Real Russia" in The Times in October 1931 which reported the starvation of peasants in Soviet Ukraine and Southern Russia.

In March 1933, he travelled to the Soviet Union for a third and final time and on 7 March eluded authorities to slip into the Ukrainian SSR, where he kept diaries of the man-made starvation he witnessed. On his return to Berlin on 29 March, he issued his press release, which was published by many newspapers, including The Manchester Guardian and the New York Evening Post:I walked along through villages and twelve collective farms. Everywhere was the cry, 'There is no bread. We are dying'. This cry came from every part of Russia, from the Volga, Siberia, White Russia, the North Caucasus, and Central Asia. I tramped through the black earth region because that was once the richest farmland in Russia and because the correspondents have been forbidden to go there to see for themselves what is happening.In the train a Communist denied to me that there was a famine. I flung a crust of bread which I had been eating from my own supply into a spittoon. A peasant fellow-passenger fished it out and ravenously ate it. I threw an orange peel into the spittoon and the peasant again grabbed it and devoured it. The Communist subsided. I stayed overnight in a village where there used to be two hundred oxen and where there now are six. The peasants were eating the cattle fodder and had only a month's supply left. They told me that many had already died of hunger. Two soldiers came to arrest a thief. They warned me against travel by night, as there were too many 'starving' desperate men.  'We are waiting for death' was my welcome, but see, we still, have our cattle fodder. Go farther south. There they have nothing. Many houses are empty of people already dead,' they cried.

This report was denounced by several Moscow-resident American journalists such as Walter Duranty and Eugene Lyons, who had been obscuring the truth to please the dictatorial Soviet regime. On 31 March, The New York Times published a denial of Jones's statement by Duranty under the headline "Russians Hungry, But Not Starving". Duranty called Jones' report "a big scare story". 

Historian Timothy Snyder has written that "Duranty's claim that there was 'no actual starvation' but only 'widespread mortality from diseases due to malnutrition' echoed Soviet uses and pushed euphemism into mendacity. This was an Orwellian distinction; and indeed George Orwell himself regarded the Ukrainian famine of 1933 as a central example of a black truth that artists of language had covered with bright colors."

In the article, Kremlin sources denied the existence of a famine; part of The New York Times headline was: "Russian and Foreign Observers in Country See No Ground for Predications of Disaster." 

On 11 April 1933, Jones published a detailed analysis of the famine in the Financial News, pointing out its main causes: forced collectivisation of private farms, removal of 6–7 millions of "best workers" (the Kulaks) from their land, forced requisitions of grain and farm animals and increased "export of foodstuffs" from USSR.

On 13 May, The New York Times published a strong rebuttal of Duranty from Jones, who stood by his report:

In a personal letter from Soviet Foreign Commissar Maxim Litvinov (whom Jones had interviewed while in Moscow) to Lloyd George, Jones was informed that he was banned from ever visiting the Soviet Union again. After his Ukraine articles, the only work Jones could get was in Cardiff on the Western Mail covering "arts, crafts and coracles", according to his great-nephew Nigel Linsan Colley. But he managed to get an interview with the owner of nearby St Donat's Castle, the American press magnate William Randolph Hearst. Hearst published Jones's account of what had happened in Ukraine – as he did for the almost identical eye-witness testimony of the disillusioned American Communist Fred Beal. – and arranged a lecture and broadcast tour of the USA.

Japan and China

Banned from the Soviet Union, Jones turned his attention to the Far East and in late 1934 he left Britain on a "Round-the-World Fact-Finding Tour". He spent about six weeks in Japan, interviewing important generals and politicians, and he eventually reached Beijing. From here he traveled to Inner Mongolia in newly Japanese-occupied Manchukuo in the company of a German journalist, Herbert Müller. Detained by Japanese forces, the pair were told that there were three routes back to the Chinese town of Kalgan, only one of which was safe.

Kidnapping and murder
Jones and Müller were subsequently captured by bandits who demanded a ransom of 200 Mauser firearms and 100,000 Chinese dollars (according to The Times, equivalent to about £8,000). Müller was released after two days to arrange for the ransom to be paid. On 1 August, Jones's father received a telegram: "Well treated. Expect release soon." On 8 August the news came that the first group of kidnappers had handed him over to a second group, and the ransom had increased to 100,000 Chinese dollars again. The Chinese and Japanese governments both made an effort to contact the kidnappers.

On 17 August 1935, The Times reported that the Chinese authorities had found Jones's body the previous day with three bullet wounds. The authorities believed that he had been killed on 12 August, the day before his 30th birthday. There was a suspicion that his murder had been engineered by the Soviet NKVD, as revenge for the embarrassment he had caused the Soviet regime. Lloyd George is reported to have said:

Legacy

Memorial
On 2 May 2006, a trilingual (English/Welsh/Ukrainian) plaque was unveiled in Jones' memory in the Old College at Aberystwyth University, in the presence of his niece Margaret Siriol Colley, and the Ukrainian Ambassador to the UK, Ihor Kharchenko, who described him as an "unsung hero of Ukraine". The idea for a plaque and funding were provided by the Ukrainian Canadian Civil Liberties Association, working in conjunction with the Association of Ukrainians in Great Britain. Dr Lubomyr Luciuk, UCCLA's director of research, spoke at the unveiling ceremony.

In November 2008, Jones and fellow Holodomor journalist Malcolm Muggeridge were posthumously awarded the Ukrainian Order of Merit at a ceremony in Westminster Central Hall, by Dr Kharchenko, on behalf of Ukrainian President Viktor Yushchenko for their exceptional service to the country and its people.

Diaries
In November 2009, Jones' diaries recording of the tragic Great Soviet Famine of 1932–33 went on display for the first time in the Wren Library of Trinity College, Cambridge.

Depictions in film
Serhii Bukovskyi's 2008 Ukrainian film The Living is a documentary about the Great Famine of 1932–33 and Jones's attempts to uncover it. The Living premiered 21 November 2008 at the Kyiv Cinema House. It was screened in February 2009 at the European Film Market, in spring 2009 at the Ukrainian Film Festival in Cologne, and in November 2009 at the Second Annual Cambridge Festival of Ukrainian Film. It received the 2009 Special Jury Prize Silver Apricot in the International Documentary Competition at the Sixth Golden Apricot International Film Festival in July 2009 and the 2009 Grand Prize of Geneva in September 2009.

In 2012, the documentary film Hitler, Stalin, and Mr Jones, directed by George Carey, was broadcast on the BBC series Storyville. It has subsequently been screened in select cinemas.

The 2019 feature film Mr Jones, starring James Norton and directed by Agnieszka Holland, focuses on Jones and his investigation of and reporting on the Ukrainian famine in the face of political and journalistic opposition. In January 2019, it was selected to compete for the Golden Bear at the 69th Berlin International Film Festival. The film won Grand Prix Golden Lions at the 44th Gdynia Film Festival in September 2019.

See also

 List of unsolved murders
 Soviet famine of 1921
 Soviet famine of 1946–47

Notes

References

Further reading
 Ray Gamache: Gareth Jones : eyewitness to the Holodomor, Cardiff : Welsh Academic Press, 2018,

External links
Gareth Jones commemorative website
Bukovsky's The Living website
Ukrainian Canadian Civil Liberties Association website
Short biography of Gareth Jones by his niece, Margaret Siriol Colley. Includes links to newspaper articles written by Jones from around the world.

 New Release - Tell Them We Are Starving: The 1933 Diaries of Gareth Jones (Kashtan Press, 2015)
 Gareth Vaughan Jones Collection, National Library of Wales

1905 births
1935 deaths
Alumni of Aberystwyth University
Alumni of Trinity College, Cambridge
British expatriates in the Soviet Union
British people murdered abroad
Deaths by firearm in China
Holodomor
Journalists killed while covering military conflicts
Male murder victims
Assassinated British journalists
People from Barry, Vale of Glamorgan
People murdered in China
Recipients of the Order of Merit (Ukraine), 3rd class
Unsolved murders in China
Welsh journalists